Davison is a patronymic surname, a contraction of Davidson, meaning "son of Davie (the pet form of David)". There are alternate spellings, including those common in the British Isles and Scandinavia: Davisson, Daveson, Davidsson, and Davidsen. It is also common as a French, Portuguese, Czech, and Jewish surname. The name was common among Norse–Gaels in the 10th century, and may have been of Norse Viking origin, given that it is a patronymic surname.

Notable people with the surname
Aidan Davison (born 1968), Northern Ireland footballer
Alex Davison (born 1979), Australian racing driver
Alexander Davison (1750–1829), British businessman, Nelson's prize agent
Archibald Thompson Davison (1883–1961), American musicologist and educator
Bennett Davison (born 1975), American basketball player
Brian Davison (cricketer) (born 1946), Rhodesian-born cricketer and politician
Brian Davison (drummer) (1942–2008), British musician
Bruce Davison (born 1946), American actor
Bryce Davison (born 1986), Canadian figure skater
Christopher Davison (born 1948), birth name of British-Irish musician Chris de Burgh
Dehenna Davison, British politician
Edward Davison (poet) (1898–1970), British poet
Emily Davison (1872–1913), British suffragette
Frederick Trubee Davison (1896–1976), American CIA Director of Personnel, son of Henry P. Davison
George Davison (photographer) (1854–1930), British photographer and business executive
Gerald Davison (born 1943), British author, lecturer and Asian art specialist
Gerald Davison (born 1939), American psychologist
Henry P. Davison (1867–1922), American banker, founding father of the League of Red Cross societies
James Davison (born 1986), Australian racing driver
JD Davison (born 2002), American basketball player
John Davison (disambiguation), several people
John Biggs-Davison (1918–1988), British politician
Lex Davison (1923–1965), Australian Grand Prix winner; grandfather of Alex Davison, Will Davison and James Davison
Liam Davison (1957–2014), Australian author
Mark Davison (born 1983), British composer (professionally known as Benson Taylor)
Mathew Davison (1839–1918), American politician
Mike Davison (born 1950), Canadian politician
Mike Davison (baseball) (1945–2013), American baseball player
Monkhouse Davison (1713–1793), British merchant (grocer)
Paul Davison (born 1971), English professional snooker player
Peter Davison (born 1951), British actor
Peter Davison (poet) (1928–2004), American poet, son of Edward Davison
Rob Davison (born 1980), Canadian hockey player
Robert Davison (disambiguation), several people
Roderic H. Davison (1917–1966), American historian of the Middle East
Ronald Davison (1920–2015), New Zealand judge
Rosanna Davison (born 1984), Irish model, crowned Miss World 2003
Teddy Davison (1887–1971), English footballer and manager
Thomas Davison (1794–1826), British journalist and printer
Wild Bill Davison (1906–1989), American jazz cornet player
Will Davison (born 1982), Australian racing driver
William Davison (disambiguation), several people named William or Will Davison
Zoe Davison (1960–2021), British racehorse trainer

See also
Davis (disambiguation)
Davison (disambiguation)
Davidsen (disambiguation)

References

English-language surnames
Patronymic surnames
Surnames from given names